Dharam Singh Deol (born 8 December 1935), commonly and widely known as Dharmendra, is an Indian actor, producer and politician who is known for his work in Hindi films and has also worked in few Punjabi films. Known as the first "He-Man" of Bollywood, Dharmendra has worked in over 300 films in a career spanning over six decades, He is one of the most successful actors in the history of Hindi cinema. In 1997, he received the Filmfare Lifetime Achievement Award for his contribution to Hindi cinema. He was a member of the 15th Lok Sabha of India, representing Bikaner constituency in Rajasthan from Bharatiya Janata Party (BJP). In 2012, he was awarded India's third-highest civilian honour Padma Bhushan by the Government of India.

Early life
Dharmendra was born Dharam Singh Deol in Sahnewal, a village in Ludhiana district, Punjab on 8 December 1935 to Kewal Kishan Singh Deol and Satwant Kaur into a Jat Sikh family. His ancestral village is Dangon, near Pakhowal Tehsil Raikot, Ludhiana.

He spent his early life in the village of Sahnewal and studied at Government Senior Secondary School at Lalton Kalan, Ludhiana, where his father was the village school headmaster. He did his matriculation in Phagwara in 1952. In those days schools of Punjab came under Panjab University, Chandigarh.

Acting career
Dharmendra was the winner of Filmfare magazine's nationally organised new talent award and went to Mumbai from Punjab, to work in the movie promised, being the award winner, but the movie was never made. He later made his debut with Arjun Hingorani's Dil Bhi Tera Hum Bhi Tere in 1960. He had a supporting role in the film Boy Friend in 1961, and was cast as the romantic interest in several films between 1960 and 1967.

He worked with Nutan in Soorat Aur Seerat (1962), Bandini (1963), Dil Ne Phir Yaad Kiya (1966), and Dulhan Ek Raat Ki (1967); with Mala Sinha in Anpadh (1962), Pooja Ke Phool (1964), Baharen Phir Bhi Aayengi (1966), and Ankhen (1968); with Nanda in Akashdeep (1965); and with Saira Banu in Shaadi (1962), Ayee Milan Ki Bela (1964), in which he was the second lead, but with negative portents, and Resham Ki Dori (1974). Dharmendra formed a successful pairing with Meena Kumari and shared the screen in 7 films namely Main Bhi Ladki Hoon (1964), Kaajal (1965), Purnima (1965), Phool Aur Patthar (1966), Majhli Didi (1967), Chandan Ka Palna (1967) and Baharon Ki Manzil (1968). He had a solo hero role in Phool Aur Patthar (1966), which was his first action film. It has been speculated for a long time that Meena Kumari and Dharmendra had an intimate relationship in the 1960s. Meena Kumari helped him to establish himself among the A-listers of that time. Phool Aur Paththar became the highest-grossing film of 1966 and Dharmendra was nominated for Filmfare Award for Best Actor for the first time. His performance in Anupama was critically acclaimed. He was given a souvenir at the 14th National Film Awards in recognition of his performance in the film. He did romantic roles in films like Aaye Milan Ki Bela, Aaya Sawan Jhoomke, Mere Hamdam Mere Dost, Ishq Par Zor Nahin, Pyar Hi Pyar and Jeevan Mrityu. He did suspense thrillers like Shikar, Blackmail, Kab Kyun Aur Kahan and Keemat. He received a Filmfare Best Actor nomination for an action hero role in the 1971 hit film Mera Gaon Mera Desh. Having played romantic as well as action hero parts, he began to be called a versatile actor by 1975.

His most successful pairing was with Hema Malini, who went on to become his wife. The couple played together in many films including Raja Jani, Seeta Aur Geeta, Sharafat, Naya Zamana, Patthar Aur Payal, Tum Haseen Main Jawaan, Jugnu, Dost, Charas, Maa, Chacha Bhatija, Azaad and Sholay. His most notable acting performances include Satyakam with Hrishikesh Mukherjee, and Sholay, which is listed by Indiatimes as one of the "Top 25 must see Bollywood films of all time". In 2005, the judges of the 50th annual Filmfare Awards awarded Sholay the special distinction of Filmfare Best Film of 50 years.

Dharmendra went on to star in a number of action films between 1976 and 1984, including Dharam Veer, Charas, Azaad, Katilon Ke Kaatil, Ghazab, Rajput, Baghawat, Jaani Dost, Dharm Aur Qanoon, Main Intequam Loonga, Jeene Nahi Doonga, Hukumat and Raaj Tilak. Along with Rajesh Khanna he acted in Tinku, Rajput and Dharm Aur Qanoon, all of which became hits, however their last film in cameo appearance together; Mohabbat Ki Kasam (1986) was a flop. He worked with Jeetendra in Dharmveer, Samraat, Burning Train, Jaan Hatheli Pe, Kinara, Dharam Karma and Nafrat Ki Aandhi. He also played con man or gangster in Shalimar, Qayamat, Jaan Hatheli Pe, Jhuta Sach, Sitamgar, Professor Pyarelal and Phandebaaz. He also was in the 1987 movie Superman. 

He has worked with various directors, each with a different style of film-making. His longest collaboration was with director Arjun Hingorani from 1960 to 1991. Dil Bhi Tera Hum Bhi Tere was the debut film of Dharmendra as an actor and Arjun's first directorial venture with Dharmendra as the lead hero. They worked together in Kab? Kyoon? Aur Kahan?, Kahani Kismat Ki, Khel Khilari Ka, Katilon Ke Kaatil and Kaun Kare Kurbanie where Arjun Hingorani was the producer and the director, and Sultanat and Karishma Kudrat Kaa, produced by Arjun Hingorani. He worked with director Pramod Chakravorty in Naya Zamana, Dream Girl, Azaad and Jugnu. Dharmendra has played dual roles in many films such as Yakeen (1969) as both the hero and the villain, Samadhi (1972) as father and son, Ghazab (1982) as twin brothers, lookalikes in Jhuta Sach (1984) and Jeeo Shaan Se (1997) in triple roles.

Dharmendra has worked with all members of the Kapoor family except for Prithviraj Kapoor and Kareena Kapoor. He has periodically made films in his native tongue of Punjabi, starring in Kankan De Ohle (Special Appearance) (1970), Do Sher (1974), Dukh Bhanjan Tera Naam (1974), Teri Meri Ik Jindri (1975), Putt Jattan De (1982) and Qurbani Jatt Di (1990). Throughout the 1980s and 1990s he continued to appear in many Hindi films in both leading and supporting roles. In 1997, he received the Filmfare Lifetime Achievement Award. While accepting the award from Dilip Kumar and his wife Saira Banu, Dharmendra became emotional and remarked that he had never won the Filmfare Award for Best Actor despite having worked in so many successful films and nearly a hundred popular films. Speaking on this occasion Dilip Kumar commented, "Whenever I get to meet with God Almighty, I will set before Him my only complaint – why did you not make me as handsome as Dharmendra?".

He experimented with film production; he launched both of his sons in films: Sunny Deol in Betaab (1983) and Bobby Deol in Barsaat (1995) as well as his nephew Abhay Deol in Socha Na Tha (2005). He was the presenter for his films like Satyakam (1969) and Kab Kyun Aur Kahan (1970). In one of her interviews, actress Preity Zinta has been quoted as saying that Dharmendra is her favourite actor. She recommended him to play her father's role in Har Pal (2008).

After a four-year hiatus from acting since 2003, he reappeared in films as a character actor in 2007 in Life in a... Metro and Apne; both films were both critically and commercially successful. In the latter, he appears with both his sons, Sunny and Bobby for the first time. His other release was Johnny Gaddaar. In 2011, he starred alongside his sons again in Yamla Pagla Deewana, which was released on 14 January 2011.

A sequel, Yamla Pagla Deewana 2, was released in 2013. He appeared with his daughter Esha Deol in his wife (Hema Malini)'s directorial venture, Tell Me O Khuda in 2011. In 2014, he played a double role in the Punjabi film, Double Di Trouble.

Other works

Political career
Dharmendra served as a Member of the Indian Parliament (Lok Sabha) from Bharatiya Janata Party representing Bikaner in Rajasthan from 2004 to 2009. During his election campaign in 2004, he made an offensive remark that he should be elected dictator perpetuo to teach "basic etiquette that democracy requires" for which he was severely criticised. He rarely attended Parliament when the house was in session, preferring to spend the time shooting for movies or doing farm-work at his farm house, for which he was again widely criticized.

Television career
In 2011, Dharmendra replaced Sajid Khan as the male judge of the third series of popular reality show India's Got Talent.

On 29 July 2011, India's Got Talent aired on Colors TV with Dharmendra as the new judge and surpassed the opening ratings of the previous two seasons.

Dharmendra has rather limited appearances on Television.

Producing and presenting films

In 1983, Dharmendra set up a production company known as Vijayta Films. In its maiden venture Betaab, released in 1983, Vijayta Films launched Dharmendra's elder son Sunny Deol as the lead actor. The movie was the second highest-grossing movie of the year. In 1990 he produced the action film Ghayal, also starring Sunny. The film won seven Filmfare Awards, including the Filmfare Award for Best Film. It won the National Film Award for Best Popular Film Providing Wholesome Entertainment. Dharmendra then launched the career of his younger son, Bobby, in 1995 in Barsaat, which was again a Box office hit.

Personal life

Dharmendra's first marriage was to Parkash Kaur at the age of 18 in 1953, when he had not entered films. He had two sons from this marriage, Sunny and Bobby, both successful film actors, and two daughters, Vijeeta and Ajeeta. His nephew Abhay Deol is also an actor.

After moving to Bombay and getting into the film business, Dharmendra married Hema Malini, which was mired with controversies at that time, with rumours about Dharmendra and Hema Malini converting to Islam for this marriage, a fact which has been denied by both since then. He and Malini starred together in a number of movies in the early 1970s, including Sholay. The couple has two daughters, Esha Deol (an actress, born in 1981) and Ahana Deol (an assistant director, born in 1986).

Dharmendra's grandson and son of Bobby Deol, is also named "Dharam Singh Deol" after Dharmendra.

In 2019, Dharmendra's grandson and Sunny Deol's son Karan Deol made a debut with Pal Pal Dil Ke Paas.

Filmography

Accolades and honours

Civilian award 

 2012 – Padma Bhushan, India's third highest civilian honour from the Government of India

National Film Awards 

 1990 – Best Popular Film Providing Wholesome Entertainment – Ghayal

Filmfare Awards

Other awards and recognitions
 In the mid-seventies, Dharmendra was voted one of the most handsome men in the world.
 He has received the World Iron Man award.
 He received a Special Award for his "contribution in Indian Cinema" at the Kalakar Awards.
 He is a recipient of the "Living Legend Award" by the Federation of Indian Chamber of Commerce and Industry (FICCI) in recognition of his outstanding contribution to the Indian entertainment industry.
 In 2003 he received a Lifetime Achievement Award at the Sansui Viewers' Choice Movie Awards.
 In 2004, he was honoured for Best Contribution to Indian Cinema.
 In 2005, he received the Zee Cine Award for Lifetime Achievement
 In 2007, he was awarded a Lifetime Achievement Award at the Pune International Film Festival (PIFF)
 In 2007, he received an IIFA Lifetime Achievement Award.
 In 2007, he received an award for Humanitarian Services to the Indian Nation.
 In 2007, he was awarded a Lifetime Achievement award by DBR Entertainment.
 In 2007, the Punjabi newspaper Quami Ekta honoured him for his contributions to the Indian cinema.
 In 2008, he was named "Actor Par Excellence" at the Max Stardust Awards.
 In 2008, he received a Lifetime Achievement Award at the 10th Mumbai Academy of the Moving Image (MAMI) International Film Festival.
 In 2009, he received a Lifetime Achievement Award at the Nashik International Film Festival (NIFF).
 In 2010, he was honoured as the Big Star Entertainer for his half-century of excellence at the BIG Star Entertainment Awards.
 In 2011, he received a Lifetime Achievement Award at the Apsara Film & Television Producers Guild Award.
 In 2011, he received a "Salaam Maharashtra Award" for completing 50 years in the film industry.
 In 2011, he was honoured with "The ITA Scroll Of Honour" at the Indian Television Academy Awards.

References

External links

 
 
 
 

India MPs 2004–2009
1935 births
Bharatiya Janata Party politicians from Maharashtra
Indian male film actors
Indian actor-politicians
Film producers from Mumbai
Male actors in Hindi cinema
Filmfare Awards winners
Filmfare Lifetime Achievement Award winners
Living people
Politicians from Mumbai
Punjabi people
Recipients of the Padma Bhushan in arts
People from Ludhiana district
20th-century Indian male actors
21st-century Indian male actors
Male actors from Mumbai
Hindi film producers
Lok Sabha members from Rajasthan
Producers who won the Best Popular Film Providing Wholesome Entertainment National Film Award